The Common Core State Standards Initiative, also known as simply Common Core, is an educational initiative from 2010 that details what K–12 students throughout the United States should know in English language arts and mathematics at the conclusion of each school grade. The initiative is sponsored by the National Governors Association and Council of Chief State School Officers.

The initiative also seeks to establish consistent educational standards across the states as well as ensure that students graduating from high school are prepared to enter credit-bearing courses at two- or four-year college programs or to enter the workforce.

Background
In the 1990s, a movement began in the U.S. to establish national educational standards for students across the country.

 (a) outlining what students were expected to know and do at each grade level 
 (b) implementing ways to find out if they were meeting those standards.

Development
In late 2008, the NGA convened a group to work on developing the standards. This team included David Coleman, William McCallum of the University of Arizona, Phil Daro, and Student Achievement Partners founders Jason Zimba and Susan Pimentel to write standards in the areas of English language arts and mathematics. Announced on June 1, 2009, the initiative's stated purpose was to "provide a consistent, clear understanding of what students are expected to learn, so teachers and parents know what they need to do to help them". Additionally, "The standards are designed to be robust and relevant to the real world, reflecting the knowledge and skills that our young people need for success in college and careers", which should place American students in a position in which they can compete in a global economy.

Work groups composed of representatives from higher education, K-12 education, teachers, and researchers drafted the Common Core State Standards. The work groups consulted educators, administrators, community and parent organizations, higher education representatives, the business community, researchers, civil rights groups, and states for feedback on each of the drafts.

The standards are copyrighted by NGA Center for Best Practices (NGA Center) and the CCSSO, which controls use of and licenses the standards. The NGA Center and CCSSO do this by offering a public license which is used by State Departments of Education. The license states that use of the standards must be "in support" of the Common Core State Standards Initiative. It also requires attribution and a copyright notice, except when a state or territory has adopted the standards "in whole".

When the CCSS was originally published, there was no intention to publish a common set of standards for English language proficiency development (ELPD). Instead, it was indicated that the ELPD standards would be left to individual states. However, the need for more guidance quickly became apparent, and led to the creation of several initiatives to provide resources to states and educators, including:
 WIDA, which is a consortium that produces standardized tests aimed at English Language Learners (ELLs), more properly known as English as an Additional Language (EAL) students, that is used in multiple states. It is still updating its standards in order to align with CCSS.
 An English language proficiency development framework from The Council of Chief State School Officers, which assists states in revising their ELPD standards to align to both the CSS and Next Generation Science Standards. 
 Both the National Board of Professional Teaching Standards (NBPTS) and the TESOL International Association are involved in establishing the standards for ESL instruction, but as of yet there isn't a standardized set of qualifications across the country for ESL instruction.
The U.S. Department of Education has since funded two grants to develop the next generation of ELPD assessments, which must measure students’ proficiency against a set of common ELPD standards, which in turn correspond to the college/career-ready standards in English language arts and mathematics. The new assessment system must also:

 Be based on a common definition of English language learner adopted by all consortium states.
 Include diagnostic (e.g., screener, placement) and summative assessments.
 Assess English language proficiency across the four language domains (reading, writing, speaking, and listening) for each grade level from kindergarten through grade 12.
 Produce results that indicate whether individual students have attained a level and complexity of English language proficiency that is necessary to fully participate in academic instruction in English.
 Be accessible to all ELLs, except those who are eligible for alternate assessments based on alternate academic standards.
 Use technology to the maximum extent appropriate to develop, administer, and score assessments.

Adoption

Since 2010, 41 states and the District of Columbia have been members of the Common Core State Standards Initiative; Alabama, Oklahoma, Texas, Virginia, Alaska, Nebraska, Indiana and South Carolina did not adopt it. Minnesota adopted the English Language Arts standards but not the Mathematics standards. Although starting as a fast trend, the curriculum lost momentum and found at least 12 states introducing legislation to prohibit implementation. Four states that initially adopted Common Core have since decided to repeal or replace it: Indiana, Arizona, Oklahoma, and South Carolina. In 2022 Florida also abandoned the standard.

Standards were released for mathematics and English language arts on June 2, 2010, with a majority of states adopting the standards in the subsequent months. States were given an incentive to adopt the Common Core Standards through the possibility of competitive federal Race to the Top grants. U.S. President Barack Obama and U.S. Secretary of Education Arne Duncan announced the Race to the Top competitive grants on July 24, 2009, as a motivator for education reform. To be eligible, states had to adopt "internationally benchmarked standards and assessments that prepare students for success in college and the work place." Though states could adopt other college- and career-ready standards and still be eligible, they were awarded extra points in their Race to the Top applications if they adopted the Common Core standards by August 2, 2010. Forty-one states made the promise in their application. Virginia and Texas were two states that chose to write their own college and career-ready standards, and were subsequently eligible for Race to the Top. Development of the Common Core Standards was funded by the governors and state schools chiefs, with additional support from the Bill and Melinda Gates Foundation, Pearson Publishing Company, the Charles Stewart Mott Foundation, and others.

Until the Every Student Succeeds Act was passed in December 2015, the US Department of Education had encouraged states to adopt the Common Core Standards by tying the grant of waivers from the No Child Left Behind Act to adoption of the Standards. However, the Every Student Succeeds Act not only replaced the No Child Left Behind Act, it also expressly prohibits the Department of Education from attempting to "influence, incentivize, or coerce State adoption of the Common Core State Standards ... or any other academic standards common to a significant number of States."

Though the Common Core State Standards do not cover science and social studies content standards, the Next Generation Science Standards were released in April 2012 and have been adopted by many states. They are not directly related to the Common Core, but their content can be cross-connected to the mathematical and English Language Arts standards within the Common Core.

English Language Arts standards
The stated goal of the English Language Arts and Literacy in History/Social Studies, Science, and Technical Subjects standards is to ensure that students are college and career ready in literacy no later than the end of high school. There are five key components to the standards for English and Language Arts: Reading, Writing, Speaking and Listening, Language, and Media and Technology. The essential components and breakdown of each of these key points within the standards are as follows:

Reading
 As students advance through each grade, there is an increased level of complexity to what students are expected to read and there is also a progressive development of reading comprehension so that students can gain more from what they read.
 Teachers, school districts, and states are expected to decide on the appropriate curriculum, but sample texts are included to help teachers, students, and parents prepare for the year ahead. Molly Walsh of Burlington Free Press notes an appendix (of state standards for reading material) that lists "exemplar texts" from works by noted authors such as Ovid, Voltaire, William Shakespeare, Ivan Turgenev, Edgar Allan Poe, Robert Frost, W. B. Yeats, Nathaniel Hawthorne, and the more contemporary, including, Amy Tan, Atul Gawande and Julia Alvarez. 
 There is some critical content for all students classic myths and stories from around the world, foundational U.S. documents, seminal works of American literature, and the writings of Shakespeare but the rest is left up to the states and the districts.
 Standards for Reading Foundational Skills are described for kindergarten to grade five. They include the areas of print concepts, phonological awareness, phonics and word recognition, and fluency. Specific teaching suggestions and research are contained in the Appendices, where “phonics” is referred to as “Phoneme-Grapheme Correspondences”.

Writing
 The driving force of the writing standards is logical arguments based on claims, solid reasoning, and relevant evidence. The writing also includes opinion writing even within the K–5 standards.
 Short, focused research projects, similar to the kind of projects students will face in their careers, as well as long-term, in-depth research is another piece of the writing standards. This is because written analysis and the presentation of significant findings are critical to career and college readiness.
 The standards also include annotated samples of student writing to help determine performance levels in writing arguments, explanatory texts, and narratives across the grades.

Speaking and listening
 Although reading and writing are the expected components of an English language arts curriculum, standards are written so that students gain, evaluate, and present complex information, ideas, and evidence specifically through listening and speaking.
 There is also an emphasis on academic discussion in one-on-one, small-group, and whole-class settings, which can take place as formal presentations or informal discussions during student collaboration.

Language
 Vocabulary instruction in the standards takes place through a mix of conversations, direct instruction, and reading so that students can determine word meanings and can expand their use of words and phrases.
 The standards expect students to use formal English in their writing and speaking, but also recognize that colleges and 21st-century careers will require students to make wise, skilled decisions about how to express themselves through language in a variety of contexts.
 Vocabulary and conventions are their own strand because these skills extend across reading, writing, speaking, and listening.

Media and technology
 Since media and technology are intertwined with every student's life and in school in the 21st century, skills related to media use, which includes the analysis and production of various forms of media, are also included in these standards.
 The standards include instruction in keyboarding, but do not mandate the teaching of cursive handwriting.

Mathematics standards
The stated goal of the mathematics standards is to achieve greater focus and coherence in the curriculum. This is largely in response to the criticism that American mathematics curricula are "a mile wide and an inch deep".

The mathematics standards include Standards for Mathematical Practice and Standards for Mathematical Content.

Practice

The Standards mandate that eight principles of mathematical practice be taught:
 Make sense of problems and persevere in solving them.
 Reason abstractly and quantitatively.
 Construct viable arguments and critique the reasoning of others.
 Model with mathematics.
 Use appropriate tools strategically.
 Attend to precision.
 Look for and make use of structure.
 Look for and express regularity in repeated reasoning.

The practices are adapted from the five process standards of the National Council of Teachers of Mathematics and the five strands of proficiency in the U.S. National Research Council's Adding It Up report. These practices are to be taught in every grade from kindergarten to twelfth grade. Details of how these practices are to be connected to each grade level's mathematics content are left to local implementation of the Standards.

Content
The standards lay out the mathematics content that should be learned at each grade level from kindergarten to Grade 8 (age 13–14), as well as the mathematics to be learned in high school. The standards do not dictate any particular pedagogy or what order topics should be taught within a particular grade level. Mathematical content is organized in a number of domains. At each grade level there are several standards for each domain, organized into clusters of related standards. (See examples below.)

In addition to detailed standards (of which there are 21 to 28 for each grade from kindergarten to eighth grade), the standards present an overview of "critical areas" for each grade.

There are six conceptual categories of content to be covered at the high school level:
 Number, and quantity;
 Algebra;
 Functions;
 Modeling;
 Geometry;
 Statistics and probability.

Some topics in each category are indicated only for students intending to take more advanced, optional courses such as calculus, advanced statistics, or discrete mathematics. Even if the traditional sequence is adopted, functions and modeling are to be integrated across the curriculum, not taught as separate courses. Mathematical Modeling is a Standard for Mathematical Practice (see above), and is meant to be integrated across the entire curriculum beginning in kindergarten. The modeling category does not have its own standards; instead, high school standards in other categories which are intended to be considered part of the modeling category are indicated in the standards with a star symbol.

Each of the six high school categories includes a number of domains. For example, the "number and quantity" category contains four domains: the real number system; quantities; the complex number system; and vector and matrix quantities. The "vector and matrix quantities" domain is reserved for advanced students, as are some of the standards in "the complex number system".

In high school (Grades 9 to 12), the standards do not specify which content is to be taught at each grade level, nor does the Common Core prescribe how a particular standard should be taught. Up to Grade 8, the curriculum is integrated; students study four or five different mathematical domains every year. The standards do not dictate whether the curriculum should continue to be integrated in high school with study of several domains each year (as is done in other countries), or whether the curriculum should be separated out into separate year-long algebra and geometry courses (as has been the tradition in most U.S. states). An appendix to the standards describes four possible pathways for covering high school content (two traditional and two integrated), but states are free to organize the content any way they want.

Key shifts 
The Common Core State Standards for Mathematics shifted the way the United States teaches math in three core ways. They built on the pre-existing standards to emphasize the skills and knowledge students will not only need in college, but in their career and in life as well. The key shifts are:

 Greater focus on fewer topics
 Coherence: Linking topics and thinking across grades
 Rigor: Pursue conceptual understanding, procedural skills and fluency, and application with equal intensity

As an example, here is the description of one of the key shifts, a greater focus on fewer topics:The Common Core calls for greater focus in mathematics. Rather than racing to cover many topics in a mile-wide, inch deep curriculum, the standards ask math teachers to significantly narrow and deepen the way time and energy are spent in the classroom. This means focusing deeply on the major work of each grade as follows:

 In grades K-2: Concepts, skills, and problem solving related to addition and subtraction
 In grades 3-5: Concepts, skills, and problem solving related to multiplication and division of whole numbers and fractions
 In grade 6: Ratios and proportional relationships, and early algebraic expressions and equations
 In grade 7: Ratios and proportional relationships, and arithmetic of rational numbers
 In grade 8: Linear algebra and linear functions

This focus will help students gain strong foundations, including a solid understanding of concepts, a high degree of procedural skill and fluency, and the ability to apply the math they know to solve problems inside and outside the classroom.

Assessment

According to the Common Core State Standards Initiative website, formal assessment was expected to take place in the 2014–2015 school year, which coincided with the projected implementation year for most states. The assessment is being created by two consortia with different approaches. The final decision of which assessment to use was determined by individual state education agencies. Both of these leading consortiums proposed computer-based exams that include fewer selected and constructed response test items, unlike the Standardized Test.

 The PARCC RttT Assessment Consortium comprises the 19 jurisdictions of Arizona, Arkansas, Colorado, District of Columbia, Florida, Illinois, Indiana, Kentucky, Louisiana, Maryland, Massachusetts, Mississippi, New Jersey, New Mexico, New York, Ohio, Pennsylvania, Rhode Island, and Tennessee. Their approach focuses on computer-based "through-course assessments" in each grade together with streamlined end-of-year tests. (PARCC refers to "Partnership for Assessment of Readiness for College and Careers" and RttT refers to the Race to the Top.)
 The second consortium, called the Smarter Balanced Assessment Consortium, comprised 31 states and territories (as of January 2014) focusing on creating "adaptive online exams". Member states include Alaska, California, Connecticut, Delaware, Hawaii, Idaho, Iowa, Maine, Michigan, Missouri, Montana, Nevada, New Hampshire, North Carolina, North Dakota, Oregon, Pennsylvania, South Carolina, South Dakota, U.S. Virgin Islands, Vermont, Washington, West Virginia, Wisconsin, and Wyoming.
As of October 2015, SBAC membership was reduced to 20 members: California, Connecticut, Delaware, Hawaii, Idaho, Iowa, Maine, Michigan, Montana, New Hampshire, North Carolina, North Dakota, Oregon, South Dakota, U.S. Virgin Islands, The Bureau of Indian Education, Vermont, Washington, West Virginia, Wyoming.

While some states are working together to create a common, universal assessment based on the Common Core State Standards, other states are choosing to work independently or through these two consortiums to develop the assessment. Florida Governor Rick Scott directed his state education board to withdraw from PARCC. Georgia withdrew from the consortium test in July 2013 in order to develop its own. Michigan decided not to participate in Smarter Balanced testing. Oklahoma tentatively withdrew from the consortium test in July 2013 due to the technical challenges of online assessment. Utah withdrew from the Smarter Balanced Assessment Consortium in August 2012.

Reception and criticism
The Common Core State Standards have drawn both support and criticism from politicians, analysts, and commentators. Teams of academics and educators from around the United States led the development of the standards, and additional validation teams approved the final standards. The teams drew on public feedback that was solicited throughout the process and that feedback was incorporated into the standards. The Common Core initiative only specifies what students should know at each grade level and describes the skills that they must acquire in order to achieve college or career readiness. Individual school districts are responsible for choosing curricula based on the standards. Textbooks bearing a Common Core label are not verified by any agency and may or may not represent the intent of the Common Core Standards. Some critics believe most current textbooks are not actually aligned to the Common Core, while others disagree.

The mathematicians Edward Frenkel and Hung-Hsi Wu wrote in 2013 that the mathematical education in the United States is in "deep crisis" caused by the way math is currently taught in schools. Both agree that math textbooks, which are widely adopted across the states, already create "mediocre de facto national standards". The texts, they say, "are often incomprehensible and irrelevant". The Common Core State Standards address these issues and "level the playing field" for students. They point out that adoption of the Common Core State Standards and how best to test students are two separate issues.

In 2012, Tom Loveless of the Brookings Institution called into question whether the standards will have any effect, and said that they "have done little to equalize academic achievement within states". In response to the standards, the libertarian Cato Institute claimed that "it is not the least bit paranoid to say the federal government wants a national curriculum." According to a study published by the Pioneer Institute, although the standards themselves are sound, their method of implementation has failed to deliver improvements in literacy, while numeracy has actually declined, due to the imposition of the mediocre curriculum sequences used in a number of mid-performing states, and the "progressive" teaching methods that are popular among Common Core developers. South Carolina Governor Nikki Haley said her state should not "relinquish control of education to the federal government, neither should we cede it to the consensus of other states."

Educational analysts from the Thomas B. Fordham Institute determined that the Common Core standards "are clearly superior to those currently in use in 39 states in math and 37 states in English. For 33 states, the Common Core is superior in both math and reading." In a follow up study, researchers found that while some states were committed to updating their standards, more resources were still needed to ensure adequate implementation of those standards, including adequate course material, capacity to deliver assessments, and accountability systems.

According to the National Education Association, the Common Core State Standards are supported by 76% of its teacher members. Research from the Fordham Institute confirmed that many teachers support Common Core, but also found that the use of multiple methods to teach a single subject negatively impacted students' and parents' perceptions of these standards.

The Heritage Foundation argued in 2010 that the Common Core's focus on national standards would do little to fix deeply ingrained problems and incentive structures within the education system.

Marion Brady, a teacher, and Patrick Murray, an elected member of the school governing board in Bradford, Maine, wrote that Common Core drains initiative from teachers and enforces a "one-size-fits-all" curriculum that ignores cultural differences among classrooms and students. Diane Ravitch, former U.S. Assistant Secretary of Education and education historian, wrote in her book Reign of Error that the Common Core standards have never been field-tested and that no one knows whether they will improve education. Nicholas Tampio, Assistant Professor of Political Science at Fordham University, said that the standards emphasize rote learning and uniformity over creativity, and fail to recognize differences in learning styles.

Michigan State University's Distinguished Professor William Schmidt wrote:

The standards require certain critical content for all students, including: classic myths and stories from around the world, America's Founding Documents, foundational American literature, and Shakespeare. In May 2013, the National Catholic Educational Association noted that the standards are a "set of high-quality academic expectations that all students should master by the end of each grade level" and are "not a national curriculum".

Advancing one Catholic perspective, over one hundred college-level scholars signed a public letter criticizing the Common Core for diminishing the humanities in the educational curriculum: The "Common Core adopts a bottom-line, pragmatic approach to education and the heart of its philosophy is, as far as we can see, that it is a waste of resources to 'over-educate' people," though the Common Core set only minimum—not maximum—standards. Mark Naison, Fordham University Professor, and co-founder of the Badass Teachers Association, raised a similar objection: "The liberal critique of Common Core is that this is a huge profit-making enterprise that costs school districts a tremendous amount of money, and pushes out the things kids love about school, like art and music".

As Common Core is implemented in New York, the new tests have been criticized. Some parents have said that the new assessments are too difficult and are causing too much stress, leading to an "opt-out movement" in which parents refuse to let their children take the tests.

Former governor Jeb Bush has said of opponents of the standards that while "criticisms and conspiracy theories are easy attention grabbers", he instead wanted to hear their solutions to the problems in American education. In 2014, Bobby Jindal wrote that "It has become fashionable in the news media to believe there is a right-wing conspiracy against Common Core."

Diane Ravitch has also stated:

Writer Jonathan Kozol uses the metaphor "cognitive decapitation" to describe the unfulfilling educational experience students are going through due to the subjects that have been excluded in their curriculum as a result of the Common Core. He notes cognitive decapitation is often experienced in urban schools of color, while white children have the privilege to continue engaging in a creative curriculum that involves the arts.

In 2016, ACT, Inc., administrators of the ACT college readiness assessment, reported that there is a disconnect between what is emphasized in the Common Core and what is deemed important for college readiness by some college instructors. ACT has been a proponent of the Common Core Standards, and Chief Executive Officer Martin Roorda stated that "ACT's findings should not be interpreted as a rebuke of the Common Core."

Results
Kentucky was the first to implement the Common Core State Standards, and local school districts began offering new math and English curricula based on the standard in August 2010. In 2013, Time magazine reported that the high school graduation rate had increased from 80 percent in 2010 to 86 percent in 2013, test scores went up 2 percentage points in the second year of using the Common Core test, and the percentage of students considered to be ready for college or a career, based on a battery of assessments, went up from 34 percent in 2010 to 54 percent in 2013. According to Sarah Butrymowicz from The Atlantic,
Kentucky's experience over the past three school years suggests it will be a slow and potentially frustrating road ahead for the other states that are using the Common Core. Test scores are still dismal, and state officials have expressed concern that the pace of improvement is not fast enough. Districts have also seen varying success in changing how teachers teach, something that was supposed to change under the new standards.

The Common Core State Standards are considered to be more rigorous than the standards they replaced in Kentucky. Kentucky's old standards received a "D" in an analysis by the Thomas B. Fordham Institute. School officials in Kentucky believe it will take several more years to adjust to the new standards, which received an A− in math and a B+ in English from the Fordham Institute.

A working paper found that Common Core had a small but significant negative effect in grade 4 reading and grade 8 mathematics based on National Assessment of Educational Progress scores.

Implementation may be one of the major reasons why early results have been uneven. District administration and teachers have, in many cases, lacked the appropriate professional development, instructional materials, and Common Core-aligned assessments to support effective implementation of the new standards.

Adoption and implementation by states
The chart below contains the adoption status of the Common Core State Standards as of March 21, 2019. Among the territories of the United States (not listed in the chart below), the U.S. Virgin Islands, Guam, the Northern Mariana Islands, and the American Samoa Islands have adopted the standards while Puerto Rico has not adopted the standards.
 As of May 12, 2015, five states have repealed Common Core. Nine additional member states have legislation in some stage of the process that would repeal Common Core participation.

See also
 21st century skills identified as being required for success in 21st century society and workplaces by educators, business leaders, academics, and governmental agencies
 No Child Left Behind, federal law requiring states to develop assessments in basic skills
 New Math, controversial attempt to revise mathematics education in post-war United States.
 Outcome-based education

References

Further reading
 Hess, Frederick M. and Michael Q. McShane eds. Common Core Meets Education Reform: What It All Means for Politics, Policy, and the Future of Schooling (Teachers College Press; 2013) 232 pages; Essays by academics and policy analysts on integrating Common Core Standards with existing efforts at accountability and other reforms.
 Pattison, Darcy. What is Common Core? (Mims House; 2013) 78 pages; Overview and introduction to the Common Core State Standards.
 Richard P. Phelps and R. James Milgram, The Revenge of K–12: How Common Core and the New SAT Lower College Standards in the U.S., Boston: Pioneer Institute, 2014.
 Tampio, Nicholas. Common Core: National Education Standards and the Threat to Democracy (Johns Hopkins University Press; 2018); Describes the history, philosophy, content, and controversy surrounding the Common Core standards for English language arts and math.
 Phelps, Richard P. Common Core Collaborators: Six Organizational Portraits Nonpartisan Education Review / Articles, 2018; Historical, financial and media analyses of the organization that spawned the Common Core Initiative, the two copyright holders, two of the paid proselytizers, and the delivery vehicle.
 Milgram, Stotsky, & Wiliam The Common Core Dissenters Nonpartisan Education Review, 2013; Includes explanations from three of the four members of the Validation Committee who refused to sign the committee report's recommendations.
 Nelson, Eric A. Cognitive Science and the Common Core Nonpartisan Education Review/Articles, 13(3), 2017.
 Stotsky, Sandra Is Common Core Racist? Nonpartisan Education Review/Essays 14(1), 2018.
 Phelps, Richard P. Real Clear Propaganda: Bellwether's Education News Bias Nonpartisan Education Review/Articles 14(5), 2018.

External links
 Common Core State Standards Initiative website

21st-century establishments in the United States
Education in the United States
Education reform
2009 in education
Standards-based education